Setzu is a comune (municipality) in the Province of South Sardinia in the Italian region Sardinia, located about  northwest of Cagliari and about  north of Sanluri.

Setzu borders the following municipalities: Genoni, Genuri, Gesturi, Tuili, Turri.

References

Cities and towns in Sardinia